Pegeen is the anglicized spelling of Peigín, an Irish given name meaning "little Peig" or "little Margaret", and may refer to:

People 

 Brigit Pegeen Kelly (1951–2016), American poet
 Pegeen Fitzgerald (1904–1989) American radio personality
 Pegeen Hanrahan (born circa 1966), mayor of Gainesville, Florida
 Pegeen Vail Guggenheim (1925–1967), American painter, daughter of art collector Peggy Guggenheim

Other 

 Margaret "Pegeen" Flaherty, character in Irish playwright John Millington Synge's The Playboy of the Western World (1907)
 Pegeen (film), 1920 American film starring Bessie Love
 "Peigín Leitir Móir", Irish folk song published in 1911

See also 
 Peggy (given name)
 List of Irish-language given names

References 

Given names derived from gemstones
Irish feminine given names